The Instructions of Kagemni is an ancient Egyptian instructional text of wisdom literature which belongs to the sebayt ('teaching') genre. Although the earliest evidence of its compilation dates to the Middle Kingdom of Egypt, its authorship has traditionally yet dubiously been attributed to Kagemni, a vizier who served during the reign of the Pharaoh Sneferu (r. 2613–2589 BC), founder of the Fourth Dynasty (belonging to the Old Kingdom).

Dating

The earliest known source for the Instructions of Kagemni is the Prisse Papyrus. This text dates to the much later twelfth dynasty of the Middle Kingdom of Egypt (perhaps by the reign of Amenemhat II from 1929 BC to 1895 BC, or a bit later in the twelfth dynasty). It is written in the Middle Egyptian language and in an archaic style of cursive hieratic.

Content
Only the end of this teaching text has survived; on the Prisse Papyrus, it is followed by the complete version of The Maxims of Ptahhotep. It is unknown how much of the text from its beginning is actually lost. Kagemni, who the text mentions as the vizier under Sneferu, is perhaps based on another vizier named Kagemni who lived during the sixth dynasty of Egypt. Kagemni is hinted as being the pupil rather than the teacher of virtues and morals in the text, and it has been proposed by scholars that his father was Kaire, a sage mentioned in the Ramesside-era Eulogy of Dead Writers (Papyrus Chester Beatty IV). Although the authorship of the text is attributed to Kagemni, it was common for ancient Egyptian wisdom texts to be falsely attributed to prestigious historical figures of much earlier times.

Written as a pragmatic guidebook of advice for the son of a vizier, the Instructions of Kagemni is similar to The Maxims of Ptahhotep. It differs from later teaching texts such as the Instruction of Amenemope, which emphasizes piety, and the Instructions of Amenemhat, which William Simpson (a professor emeritus of Egyptology at Yale University) described as a "political piece cast in instruction form." Kagemni advises that one should follow a path of modesty and moderation, which is contrasted with things to avoid: pride and gluttony. In Kagemni, the "silent man" who is modest, calm, and practices self-control is seen as the most virtuous; this type of person is later contrasted with his polar opposite, the "heated man", in Amenemope. According to Miriam Lichtheim, the virtuous "silent man" first described in Kagemni "was destined for a major role in Egyptian morality."

Notes

References
Lichtheim, Miriam. (1996). "Didactic literature" in Ancient Egyptian Literature: History & Forms. Edited by Antonio Loprieno. Leiden: E.J. Brill. .
Parkinson, R.B. (2002). Poetry and Culture in Middle Kingdom Egypt: A Dark Side to Perfection. London: Continuum. .
Simpson, William Kelly. (1972). The Literature of Ancient Egypt: An Anthology of Stories, Instructions, and Poetry. Edited by William Kelly Simpson. Translations by R.O. Faulkner, Edward F. Wente, Jr., and William Kelly Simpson. New Haven and London: Yale University Press. .
Battiscombe Gunn. (1906), "THE WISDOM OF THE EAST,  THE INSTRUCTION OF PTAH-HOTEP AND THE INSTRUCTION OF KE'GEMNI: THE OLDEST BOOKS IN THE WORLD", LONDON, JOHN MURRAY, ALBEMARLE STREET, 1906, https://www.gutenberg.org/files/30508/30508-h/30508-h.htm

Further reading
Erman, Adolf. (2005). Ancient Egyptian Literature: A Collection of Poems, Narratives and Manuals of Instructions from the Third and Second Millennia BC. Translated by Aylward M. Blackman. New York: Cambridge University Press. London: Kegan Paul Limited. .
Gardiner, Alan H. "The Instruction to Kagemni and his brethren.", Journal of Egyptian Archaeology, London, 32, 1946, pp. 71–74.

External links
The Maxims of Good Discourse or the Wisdom of Ptahhotep ca.2200 BCE (contains full fragmentary version—in original hieroglyphs and translated English version by Gardiner (1946)—of Kagemni, which is one of two instructional texts found on the Prisse Papyrus)

Ancient Egyptian instruction literature